The Dr. Charles H. Dubs Townhouse is a historic townhouse in Natchez, Mississippi, USA.

History
The townhouse was built in 1852 for Charles H. Dubs, a physician from Philadelphia.

Heritage significance
It has been listed on the National Register of Historic Places since May 5, 1978.

References

Houses on the National Register of Historic Places in Mississippi
Houses completed in 1852
Houses in Adams County, Mississippi
1852 establishments in Mississippi